The Jujeña Football League is one of the Soccer Regional Leagues in Argentina and is the entity that brings together football teams Province Jujuy. It was founded on December 15, 1922 and is based in the city of San Salvador de Jujuy.

Jujuy League currently has representation at the national level with clubs Gimnasia Jujuy in the First National B Argentine football, and clubs Altos Hornos Zapla and Talleres de Perico both in the Argentine Match B.

The main purpose of the clubs is to qualify for the Match of the Interior Argentine fifth level tournaments organized by the Argentine Football Association.

Champions League

Jujuy amateur Football League  
TOP 10 Clubs (1929-1933) 
 1928: General Belgrano
 1929: United Youth
 1930: Regiment 20
 1931 : General Belgrano
 1932 : General Belgrano
 1933 :  No Competition problems due to casual quake

Jujuy Football League  
TOP 15 Club (1933–1949)
 1934 : Regiment 20
 1935 : General Belgrano
 1936 : Engineer Arrieta
 1937 : Not deputed
 1938 : C. R. Y. S.
 1939 : Independent
 1940 : Independent

Jujuy Football League 
 1941 : Cazadores de Los Andes
 1942 : General Belgrano
 1943: Independent
 1944 : Cazadores de Los Andes
 1945 : Gymnastics and Fencing
 1946 : Gymnastics and Fencing
 1947: Gymnastics and Fencing
 1948 : Gymnastics and Fencing
 1949 :  Do not deputed by the quake 
 1950:  Do not deputed by the quake 
 1951 :  Do not deputed by the quake 
 1952 : Gymnastics and Fencing

Jujeña Football League  
 TOP 20 Clubs (1953–1970) 
 1953 :  No , the deputed
 1954: General Belgrano
 1955 :  No , the deputed
 1956 :  No , the deputed
 1957 :  No , the deputed
 1958 :  No , the deputed
 1959 : Discontinued
 1960 : Athletic Gorriti
 1961 : Altos Hornos Zapla
 1962 : Gymnastics and Fencing
 1963: Gymnastics and Fencing
 1964 : Talleres de Perico
 1965 : Gymnastics and Fencing
 1966 : Talleres de Perico
 1967: Gymnastics and Fencing
 1968: Independent
 1969: Gymnastics and Fencing
 1970:  No , the deputed

 TOP 15 Clubs (1970–present) 
 1971:  No competition
 1972: Altos Hornos Zapla
 1973: Altos Hornos Zapla
 1974: Altos Hornos Zapla
 1975: Gymnastics and Fencing
 1976: Gymnastics and Fencing
 1977: Gymnastics and Fencing
 1978: Altos Hornos Zapla
 1979 : Gymnastics and Fencing
 1980: Gymnastics and Fencing
 1981: Gymnastics and Fencing
 1982 : Athletic Cuyaya
 1983: Altos Hornos Zapla
 1984: Altos Hornos Zapla
 1985 : Youth Cellulose
 1986: Gymnastics and Fencing
 1987: Altos Hornos Zapla
 1988 : Youth Cellulose
 1989 : Altos Hornos Zapla
 1990 : Talleres de Perico
 1991 : Talleres de Perico
 1992 : Athletic Gorriti
 1993 : Talleres de Perico
 1994 : Altos Hornos Zapla
 1995 : Ciudad de Nieva
 1996 : Ciudad de Nieva (A)
 1996-1997 Altos Hornos Zapla (C)
 1997 : Gimnasia (A)
 1997-1998 Altos Hornos Zapla (C)
 1998 : Talleres de Perico
 1999 : Athletic Gorriti
 2000 : Talleres de Perico
 2001 : Talleres de Perico
 2002 : Altos Hornos Zapla
 2003 : General Lavalle
 2004 : Gymnastics and Fencing
 2005 : Deportivo Los Perales
 2006 : Athletic Cuyaya
 2007 : Altos Hornos Zapla
 2008 : Gymnastics and Fencing
 2009 : Gymnastics and Fencing
 2010 : Gymnastics and Fencing
 2011 Athletic Cuyaya
 2012: Gymnastics and Fencing
 2013 Athletic Luján
 2014 :  For depute

History  Jujeña Football League

Participating Clubs  
These are the teams that make the Jujeña Football League .

San Salvador de Jujuy 
 Club Ciudad de Nieva
 Club Atlético Cuyaya
 General Lavalle Athletic Club
 Athletic Club Gimnasia Jujuy
 Club Atlético Gorriti
 Sports Club Luján 
 Club Sportivo Palermo
 The Vineyard Athletic Association
 Club Deportivo El Cruce
 General Belgrano Athletic Club
 Athletic Club Los Perales Trade

Palpalá 
 Cultural and Sports Association Altos Hornos Zapla
 Club Atlético Palpalá

Perico City 
 Club Atlético Talleres

Tilcara 
 Terry Athletic Club

See also 
 First B (Jujuy)
 Cup Jujuy

Regional football leagues in Argentina